Dong-A Law School is one of the professional graduate schools of Dong-A University, located in Busan, South Korea. Founded in 2009, it is one of the founding law schools in South Korea and is one of the medium-sized schools with each class in the three-year J.D. program having approximately 80 students.

Programs
Dong-A Law specializes on the international transactions law.

References

External links 
 

Law schools in South Korea
2009 establishments in South Korea
Educational institutions established in 2009

ko:동아대학교 법학전문대학원